This article lists political parties in Vanuatu.
Vanuatu has a multi-party system with numerous political parties, in which no one party often has a chance of gaining power alone, and parties must work with each other to form coalition governments. Not all parties have a consistent ideology, and of those that don't, most members tend to support the political positions/attitudes of the party leader. Politicians switching parties several times over the span of a few years is not uncommon. Governments typically comprise coalitions of numerous small parties which change regularly, with parties and MPs "crossing the floor," and Prime Ministers being ousted in motions of no confidence has previously occurred several times in one legislative term.

The parties

Friend Melanesian Party (FMP)
Green Confederation (Vanuatu Grin Konfederesen, Ol Grin)
Iauko Group (Iauko Grup, IG)
Land and Justice Party (Graon mo Jastis Pati, GJP)
Leaders Party of Vanuatu (LPV)
Melanesian Progressive Party (MPP)
Nagriamel Movement (Nagriamel)
National Community Association (Association de la communauté nationale, ACN)
National United Party (NUP)
People's Action Party (Parti de l'Action Populaire, PAP)
People's Progressive Party (PPP)
Reunification Movement for Change (RMC)
Rural Development Party (RDP)
Union of Moderate Parties (Union des Partis Moderés, UPM)
Vanua'aku Pati (VP)
Vanuatu Labour Party (Vanuatu Leba Pati, VLP)
Vanuatu National Development Party (VNDP)
Vanuatu Presidential Party (VPP)
Vanuatu Republican Party (Parti républicain de Vanuatu, PRV)

See also
 Politics of Vanuatu
 Elections in Vanuatu

References 

 
Vanuatu
Vanuatu

Political parties
Parties